The 2015–16 season was Reading's 145th year in existence and third consecutive season in the Championship, and covered the period from 1 July 2015 to 30 June 2016. Reading finished the season 17th in the Championship, whilst also reaching the Quarter-Finals of the FA Cup and the Third Round of the League Cup.

Season review

Pre-season
Following the conclusion of the 2014–15 season, Reading announced that their preseason would include a tour of Thailand and Malaysia, beginning 5 July. Reading then announced, on 26 May 2015, that they would play a pre-season friendly against Bristol Rovers on 21 July 2015, and a day later announced a friendly match against Crawley Town would take place on 27 July. On 29 May 2015, Reading announced they will face Swansea City at Adams Park on 24 July 2015. On 1 June, Michael Hector signed a new three-year contract, keeping him at the club until the summer of 2018.  On 3 June, the club announced six pre-season friendlies for the under-21 squad.
On 16 June 2015, the first round draw for the Football League Cup was made, with Reading being drawn away against Colchester United. The next day, 17 June 2015, the fixtures for the forthcoming season were announced.

On 22 June 2015, Reading announced a new sponsorship deal with Thai energy drink company Carabao Dang for their home shirt during the 2015–16 season, and three days later Reading added Dave Beasant, Steven Reid, Jonathan Urwin and Stewart Bannister to the backroom staff. Youngster Tarique Fosu signed a new two-year contract with the club on 26 June. On 29 June, Thai Airways were announced as the club's away shirt sponsors for the 2015–16 season.

On 30 July, Jordan Obita signed a contract extension with the club until 2018.

Transfers
Following the conclusion of the 2014–15 season, Reading announced that they would not be renewing the contracts of Daniel Lincoln, Jonathan Henly, Aleksandar Gogic, Zat Knight, Jure Travner, George McLennan, Danny Guthrie, Ryan Edwards and Yakubu. The announcement also stated that Mikkel Andersen also wouldn't be offered a new deal at the time, whilst Adam Federici, Alex Pearce, Stephen Kelly and Jem Karacan had all been offered new contracts. On 27 May 2015, it was confirmed that Adam Federici had rejected the clubs offer and signed a three-year contract with A.F.C. Bournemouth. 12 days later, on 8 June 2015, Derby County announced that they had signed Alex Pearce on a three-year contract, ending his 14-year stay with Reading. On 25 June 2015, Mikkel Andersen returned to Denmark, signing for FC Midtjylland. On 8 July, Galatasaray confirmed the signing of Jem Karacan on a free transfer, following the expiration of his Reading contract at the end of the previous season. Jure Travner re-signed for NK Celje on 15 July, whilst Danny Guthrie joined Blackburn Rovers on 5 August 2015.

On 29 June 2015, Reading confirmed the signing of Orlando Sá on a three-year deal from Legia Warsaw, with Stephen Quinn signing a three-year deal the following day from Hull City. Paul McShane followed Quinn in signing for Reading from Hull City on the 2 July, penning a three-year deal. Youngster Jake Sheppard signed his first professional contract with Reading on 3 July, keeping him at the club until 2017. Goalkeeper Jonathan Bond joined Reading on 4 July, for a reported £250,000 from Watford, signing a three-year deal.
On 14 July, Reading confirmed the Ali Al-Habsi had joined on a two-year contract, whilst youngster Niall Keown had signed a new three-year contract.
On 15 July, Lisandro Semedo was signed from Sporting CP, whilst Rowan Liburd joined from Isthmian League side Billericay Town, on a two-year contract, on 22 July. On 29 July 2015, Kuhl joined RCD Mallorca on trial with a view to a season-long loan deal with the Spanish Segunda División side. Sultan Al Harthy from Arsenal Soccer School Oman joined the club on trial at the end of July.

Defender Andrew Taylor joined Reading on a season-long loan from Wigan Athletic on 5 August, with Craig Tanner moving to Plymouth Argyle on loan to Plymouth Argyle on the same day until January 2016. Young keeper joined Chesham United on a Four-Month loan deal two days later, before midfielder Jake Taylor left on a season-long loan to Motherwell, and Hope Akpan joined Blackburn Rovers on a permanent deal on 11 August. The following day Reading announced the signing of Paolo Hurtado on a three-year contract from Paços de Ferreira. On 18 August, midfielder Álex Fernández joined the club on a season-long loan deal from RCD Espanyol.

On 20 August 2015, Robert Dickie joined Cheltenham Town on a one-month loan deal, with Pavel Pogrebnyak moving back to Russia on 27 August 2015, signing for Dynamo Moscow. On 31 August, Lasha Dvali signed for MSV Duisburg on a free transfer, with Lucas Piazon signing a season-long loan deal from Chelsea on the same day.

On transfer deadline day, Reading sold defender Michael Hector to Chelsea, before loaning him back for the remainder of the season, loaned out Aaron Kuhl to Dundee United until 4 January 2016, and signed Matěj Vydra and Ola John join the club on season-long loan deal from Watford and Benfica respectively.

August
Reading started the 2015–16 season with a 2–1 defeat to Birmingham City, away at St Andrew's, on 8 August. Birmingham went 2–0 up through goals from David Cotterill and Jon Toral either side of half-time, before Nick Blackman just before the hour mark and Orlando Sá had a 98th-minute penalty saved. Three days later, Reading defeated Colchester United 1–0, after extra time, in the League Cup with the goal coming from Chris Gunter.
On 16 August, Reading hosted Leeds United in a scoreless draw, before visiting Sheffield Wednesday three days later in a game that finished 1–1. Danny Williams scored Reading's goal in the 49th minute before Modou Sougou scored a 90th-minute equaliser. Reading played out their third draw of the season on 22 August, a 0–0 home game against MK Dons before a midweek Second Round League Cup victory over Portsmouth on 25 August. Portsmouth took the lead in the 40th minute through Conor Chaplin, before second half goals from Nick Blackman and Garath McCleary gave Reading the victory. Reading ended August with a 3–1 victory away to Brentford on 29 August, with the goals coming from Sá, a double from Nick Blackman, and Lasse Vibe scoring for Brentford.

September
On 9 September, Aaron Tshibola signed a new contract with the club, keeping him at Reading until the summer of 2019. On 11 September, youngster Harry Cardwell joined Woking F.C. on loan until the end of October. The same day, Reading hosted Ipswich Town, with a final score of 5–1.  Sá scored a hat-trick, with a strike by Blackman and a 25-yard goal from Norwood in the 87th minute adding to the score. Four days later, on 15 September, Reading lost 1–0 to Derby County. Tom Ince scored the winner for Derby in the 69th minute after Sá received a red card for an off-the-ball incident during first-half stoppage time. On 18 September, Dominic Samuel signed a new contract with the club on a deal until the summer of 2018. The following day, Bristol City hosted Reading, who produced a 0–2 win from early goals from Blackman and McCleary. On 22 September, Reading hosted Everton in the third round of the League Cup. Despite a first-half goal by Blackman, second-half goals from a corner and a free kick gave Everton a 1–2 win and thus knocking Reading out of the competition. On 23 September, Robert Dickie extended his loan at Cheltenham Town for another month. Reading's last match of the month was on 26 September away to Burnley, where goals from Blackman and Lucas Piazon in the first 10 minutes saw Reading through to a 1–2 win and move to 3rd place in the league.

October
On 3 October Reading hosted second-place Middlesbrough at the Madejski Stadium.  Within 15 seconds of kick-off, Hal Robson-Kanu crossed the ball to Danny Williams who headed the ball in, scoring Reading's third-fastest goal. Blackman added to Reading's lead in the 88th minute with a penalty. On 8 October, manager Steve Clarke and forward Nick Blackman were nominated for September's "Manager of the Month" and "Player of the Month" awards respectively, whilst later the same day defender Jake Cooper extended his contract with the club until the summer of 2018. On 9 October, Reading played a behind-closed-doors friendly against West Ham United at the Boleyn Ground. The teams were level 2–2 at half-time thanks to goals from Piazon, a Blackman penalty and two from Mauro Zárate. After the break, Tshibola put Reading ahead before a West Ham own goal extended the lead.  Andy Carroll pulled one back for West Ham, with the final score 3–4. Later on in the same day, Simon Cox joined Bristol City until the beginning of January 2016.

Harry Cardwell returned to the club on 12 October, whilst Noor Husin joined Hemel Hempstead Town. On 16 October, youngster Sean Long joined League Two side Luton Town on an initial one-month loan deal, whilst fellow U21 defender Rob Dickie extended his loan at Cheltenham Town for another month.

Following the mid-October International break for UEFA Euro 2016 qualifying, Reading hosted Charlton Athletic on 17 October. A 76th-minute header by Blackman was the only goal of the game, giving Reading three points and moving the club up to second place in the league. On 19 October, academy graduate Jack Stacey signed a new contract with Reading, keeping him at the club until the summer of 2019.
On 20 October, Reading played away to Rotherham United, where they drew 1–1 following Blackman's 25-yard strike in the 26th minute. Reading's five-match unbeaten run in the league ended on 24 October away to Fulham.  Despite Reading's two goals from Piazon and Sa before half-time, Fulham equalised within the first 10 minutes of the second half, later adding to their score to defeat Reading 4–2.

Reading's final match of the month was against Brighton and Hove Albion at the Madejski Stadium on 31 October. Top-of-the-league Brighton gained the lead shortly after half-time, before Matěj Vydra scored his first Reading goal to equalise.  Reading ended the month one place below the playoff positions in 7th.

November
Reading's first match of November was hosting Huddersfield Town on 4 November.  Despite Reading conceding in the second minute, Norwood scored a free kick in the 15th minute to level the score.  A second Huddersfield goal took the score to 1–2 by half time; Reading substitute Ola John equalised in the 84th minute to gain the club a point for the 2–2 draw and remain 7th in the league. On 7 November Reading lost 2–0 away to Cardiff City, and consequently dropped to 8th in the league. On 9 November it was reported that Colorado Rapids midfielder, Dillon Powers, had joined the club on a two-week trial. The following day it was announced that Kevin Foley was also training with the squad with the view to signing a short-term contract with the club. On 11 November, Tarique Fosu moved to League One side Fleetwood Town on loan until 2 January 2016, with Dominic Samuel joining Gillingham F.C. on loan until 10 December two days later.

On 18 November, manager Steve Clarke was linked with the vacant Fulham manager's job. The following day it was announced that Clarke would stay as manager of Reading.  On 21 November, Reading defeated Bolton Wanderers at 2–1 at home, with Piazon and Williams supplying Reading's goals. On 23 November, Jack Stacey joined Barnet F.C. on a short-term loan deal. Three days later, on 26 November, Andrija Novakovich joined Cheltenham Town on loan until 2 January 2016, whilst Dominic Hyam joined Basingstoke Town until the same date.

Reading's last game of the month was on 28 November away to Nottingham Forest.  Despite an early goal by Vydra, Reading lost 3–1 and dropped to 9th in the table; though just one point from the play-off positions.

December
On 3 December Reading suffered a 1–0 home defeat to Queens Park Rangers, dropping to 11th but remaining within one win of the play-offs. The following morning, 4 December, Steve Clarke was sacked as manager of the club, with Under-21 manager Martin Kuhl taking over in an interim role. On 7 December, Reading were drawn away to Huddersfield Town in the Third Round of the FA Cup. On 9 December, Samuel had his loan spell with Gillingham extended until 2 January 2016.

On 10 December, Rob Dickie extended his loan with Cheltenham Town until the end of January, with Aaron Kuhl returning early from his loan spell with Dundee United on 14 December.

Martin Kuhl's first game in charge of Reading was a loss away to Preston North End on 12 December. Shortly after half-time, Reading conceded a penalty which gave Preston the only goal of the match. Also on the 12th, youngster George Legg was recalled from his loan spell with Chesham United. Kuhl's second (and final) match managing Reading was a second away loss, when Reading were beaten 2–1 at Hull on 16 December. Blackman gave Reading the lead in the first half, but two second-half home goals (including a 90th-minute winner) made Reading slip to the bottom half of the league.

On 17 December, and after weeks of speculation, Brian McDermott returned to the club as their new manager. His first match was against Blackburn Rovers on 20 December, where Williams's 11th-minute volley gave Reading the lead and provided the match's only goal. On 24 December, Under-21 goalkeeper, George Legg, how had spent the first half of the season on loan at Chesham United joined Hampton & Richmond Borough on an initial 28-day youth loan. McDermott's next two games were losses; the first was a 1–0 away defeat to Wolverhampton Wanderers on 26 December, and the second a 2–1 home loss to Brentford on 28 December (during which Hector received a second yellow card for diving). A behind-closed-doors friendly at Hogwood Park on 30 December saw Reading beat QPR 4–2 in their final match of the year.

January
Reading hosted Bristol City on 2 January in their first game of the year. Reading won the match 1–0 from a 91st-minute goal by Blackman. Following the match, Bristol City confirmed that Simon Cox had returned to Reading following his loan spell at the club. On 9 January, Reading earned a third-round replay in the FA Cup following a 2–2 draw away to Huddersfield.  Despite leading 1–2 in the 90th minute, Norwood conceded a penalty that Huddersfield converted to force the replay.
On 12 January, Reading gained a 1–1 away draw at Derby which kept them 12th in the league.
Reading's first defeat of the year was a 1–0 away loss to MK Dons on 16 January.  Three days later, on 19 January, Reading hosted the replay of the FA Cup Third Round match against Huddersfield.  After gaining a 0–2 lead by the 15th minute, Huddersfield lost Jonathan Hogg to a straight red card in the 27th minute. Piazon scored directly from the resultant free kick, before Vydra scored a hat-trick.  A 93rd-minute goal by Férnandez saw Reading through to the fourth round with a 5–2 win.
On 23 January, Reading played Sheffield Wednesday at home, drawing 1–1.
The final match of the month was hosting Walsall in the fourth round of the FA Cup. Goals from Robson-Kanu and Williams, as well as two from Vydra, saw Reading progress into the fifth round with a 4–0 win.

Transfers
On 5 January, Dominic Samuel extended his loan stay at Gillingham until 28 January. The next day, 6 January, Nick Blackman moved to Derby County for an undisclosed fee, and Craig Tanner extended his loan deal at Plymouth Argyle until the end of the season.

On 19 January, Reading signed George Evans from Manchester City, with Yann Kermorgant signing an 18-month contract from Bournemouth the following day. The following week, on 25 January, Jake Taylor's loan with Motherwell was cancelled, going on to join Exeter City permanently later the same day. The following day Orlando Sá left the club, joining Israeli side Maccabi Tel Aviv, and on 28 January, Deniss Rakels moved to Reading from Polish side KS Cracovia, whilst Paolo Hurtado moved to Vitória on loan for the remainder of the season. On 1 February, transfer deadline day, Scotland U21 international Dominic Hyam moved to Dagenham & Redbridge on loan until 5 March, and Dominic Samuel extended his stay at Gillingham until the end of the season.

In early January, Bosnian U-17 international Seid Behram, who had been with the academy for a few months, signed permanently for the club from Željezničar, whilst Andrija Novakovich, Tariqe Fosu, Sean Long, Rob Dickie, Dominic Hyam, Lewis Collins, Bogdan Vaštšuk, Jake Sheppard, Noor Husin and Zak Jules all returned from their respective loan spells.

Reading took former Real Betis midfielder Javier Matilla on trial during the later half of January.

February
On 2 February Reading played away at Ipswich Town.  After Reading conceded midway through the second half, McCleary scored a 69th-minute penalty before Ipswich took the lead in the 89th minute.  Reading's 2–1 loss resulted in them dropping to 16th in the league. Reading saw Wolverhampton Wanderers to an eventless 0–0 draw at the Madejski Stadium on 6 February. Reading gained a further 0–0 draw on 13 February, hosting Burnley. On 18 February, Gunter signed a new two-year contract, keeping him at Reading until the summer of 2018.
Reading's fifth-round FA Cup match against West Bromwich Albion took place on 20 February.  Despite conceding after the half-time break, goals from McShane, Hector and Piazon gave a 3–1 victory and secured Reading's place in the quarter finals for the second year running.
Reading saw their first league win in over seven weeks with a 1–0 home victory against Rotherham United on 23 February. This was followed four days later with a 3–4 away win at Charlton Athletic, which saw both Kermorgant and Rakels score their first goals for Reading.

On 12 February, Liam Kelly joined Bath City on loan for a month, whilst Jake Sheppard joined Eastbourne Borough. On 27 February, goalkeeper Stuart Moore joined Peterborough United on a 28-day emergency loan.

March
On 4 March, Rowan Liburd joined Wycombe Wanderers F.C. on a one-month loan deal. On 7 March, it was announced that Polish midfielder Aleksander Jagiełło had joined the club on trial.

Huddersfield Town hosted Reading on 8 March, where a 3–1 home victory saw Reading drop three league places to 14th.
Reading's FA Cup quarter final match against Crystal Palace took place on 11 March at the Madejski Stadium.  After a goalless draw for 85 minutes, Reading conceded a penalty that also saw Cooper receive his second yellow card of the game.  Despite Al Habsi's touch to the ball, Yohan Cabaye's spot kick gave Crystal Palace the lead before Fraizer Campbell increased the score to 2–0, knocking Reading out of the competition. Youngster Liam Kelly also extended his loan deal with Bath City for an additional month. A second consecutive league defeat occurred away to promotion hopefuls Brighton and Hove Albion on 15 March, with Reading subsequently placed 15th in the division. On the same day, young defender Sean Long joined Braintree Town on loan until the end of the season.
The club's run of league defeats ended on 19 March with a 1–1 home draw against Cardiff City. The result saw them drop to 17th in the league, 8 points above of the relegation zone.

On 23 March, youngster Robert Dickie returned to Cheltenham Town on loan for the remainder of the season, with Jack Stacey and Tarique Fosu moving on loan to Carlisle United and Accrington Stanley for the remainder of the season the following day. Also on the 24th, Harry Cardwell joined Braintree Town, Hammed Lawal joined Bishop's Stortford and Lewis Ward joined Sutton United.

April
Reading's first game of the month was away to Bolton Wanderers on 2 April. In the 90th minute, Ola John made a  strike to secure Reading three points. Reading had a second consecutive win on 5 April, hosting Nottingham Forest.  Although trailing 0–1 at half-time, goals from Vydra and Norwood provided a 2–1 win. Reading's three-match winning streak came to an end on 9 April with a 0–2 home defeat to Birmingham City, in a game that was described as "disappointing". This was followed by a 2–1 away defeat to Middlesbrough on 12 April, during which an on-pitch incident between McShane and Williams resulted them both receiving a three-match ban from the FA for violent conduct. A further away loss came at Leeds on 16 April, with Reading subsequently placed 15th in the league. Reading had a fourth consecutive defeat when they lost 1–2 to Hull City on 19 April, although a 1–1 away draw at Queens Park Rangers on 23 April ended the losing form.

Reading's last game of the month, and last home game of the season, was a 1–2 defeat to Preston North End.

On 28 April it was announced that Hector and Piazon had returned to Chelsea after their loans were curtailed by a week.

May
On 2 May, Turkish U20 international midfielder, Anil Capkin, joined the club on a week long trial with a view to a summer move. The following day, 3 May 2016, Jack Stacey was recalled from his loan with Carlisle United a week early. On 5 May, young defender Tennai Watson signed a new two-year contract with the club, keeping him at Reading until the summer of 2018. On 5 May, under-21 keeper Lewis Ward joined Icelandic Úrvalsdeild side Fylkir on loan until 26 June 2016.

On 9 May, it was confirmed that Reading would not be renewing the contracts of Anton Ferdinand, Hal Robson-Kanu, Simon Cox, Nana Owusu, Pierce Sweeney, Lewis Collins, Noor Husin, Hammad Lawal, Samúel Friðjónsson, Conor Shaughnessy and Bogdan Vaštšuk. It was also confirmed that Dominic Hyam, Robert Dickie, Shane Griffin, Sean Long, Aaron Kuhl, Liam Kelly, Zak Jules, George Legg had all been offered new contacts, alongside Under-18 players Omar Richards, Harrison Bennett, Ryan East, Sam Smith, Luke Southwood, Billy Collings and Joe Tupper.

On 25 May, Reading announced the signing of Danzell Gravenberch for the upcoming 2016–17 season, whilst it was also revealed that Bosnia youth-team member Seid Behram had left the club after only Five-months, joining Lille, and First Team Coach Chris Davies was leaving to be Brendan Rodgers Assistant Manager at Celtic on 1 June. On 27 May, manager Brian McDermott was fired. Jaap Stam was announced as McDermott's replacement on 13 June 2016.

Transfers

In

Out

Loans in

Loans out

Released

Trial

Squad

Left club during season

Friendlies

Competitions

Championship

League table

Results summary

Results by matchday

Matches

League Cup

FA Cup

Squad statistics

Appearances and goals

|-
|colspan="14"|Players away from the club on loan:

|-
|colspan="14"|Players who appeared for Reading but left during the season:

|}

Goal scorers

Clean sheets

Disciplinary record

Awards

Manager of the Month

Player of the Month

Notes

References

Reading
Reading F.C. seasons